The Constitution Alteration (Monopolies) Bill 1910, was put to voters for approval in a referendum held in 1911 that sought to alter the Australian Constitution to give the Commonwealth power to nationalise any corporation deemed by both houses of parliament to be a monopoly.

Question
Do you approve of the proposed law for the alteration of the Constitution entitled 'Constitution Alteration (Monopolies) 1910'?

The proposal was to add section 51a to the Constitution to read as follows:
51a. When each House of the Parliament, in the same session, has by Resolution declared that the industry or business of producing manufacturing or supplying any specified goods, or of supplying any specified services, is the subject of a monopoly, the Parliament shall have power to make laws for carrying on the industry or business by or under the control of the Commonwealth, and acquiring for that purpose on just terms any property used in connexion with the industry or business.

Results
The referendum was not approved by a majority of voters, and a majority of the voters was achieved in only one state, Western Australia.Question: Do you approve of the proposed law for the alteration of the Constitution entitled 'Constitution Alteration (Monopolies) 1910'?

Discussion
This was the first of many times that similar questions were asked at a referendum. On every occasion the public decided not to vest power in the government over monopolies.

See also
Politics of Australia
History of Australia

References

Further reading
 Standing Committee on Legislative and Constitutional Affairs (1997) Constitutional Change: Select sources on Constitutional change in Australia 1901–1997. Australian Government Printing Service, Canberra.
 Bennett, Scott (2003). Research Paper no. 11 2002–03: The Politics of Constitutional Amendment Australian Department of the Parliamentary Library, Canberra.
 Australian Electoral Commission (2007) Referendum Dates and Results 1906 – Present AEC, Canberra.

1911 referendums

1911 (Monopolies)
Referendum (Monopolies)